Murder at Koh E Fiza is a 2022 Hindi language film starring Amitryaan and Shreya Narayan. The film is produced under the banner of Jai Viratra Entertainment limited.

Production
Murder at Koh E Fiza is Directed by Divakar Naik and produced by Manoj Nandwana and Jai Viratra Entertainment. Screenplay and dialogue by Badrish Patil, music by Aakash Joy Chanda, lyrics by Rahul Goenka.Background score by Aditya Bedekar, edited by Jitendra K Shah and cinematography by Dipak Nayak. The film released on 24th Nov 2022.

Cast
 Shreya Narayan as Kangana
 Akram Khan as Rajveer Singh
 Amitryaan as Vikram Malhotra 
 Sunny Singh as Udai Saxena

References

External links
 https://www.bollywoodhungama.com/movie/murder-koh-e-fiza/cast/
 https://www.filmibeat.com/bollywood/movies/murder-at-koh-e-fiza.html
 https://www.imdb.com/title/tt7510900
 https://www.movietalkies.com/movies/murder-at-koh-e-fiza/

Hindi-language drama films
Indian drama films
2022 films